Dan Patrick Masteller is a former Major League Baseball first baseman.

Originally drafted by the Twins in the 11th round of the 1989 Major League Baseball draft, Masteller played in their organization until June, 1995, when he made his major league debut.

On July 28, 1995, Masteller came to bat in the bottom of the ninth in a 3-3 game against Yankees' Cy Young winner Jack McDowell. Carrying a sub-.200 average, with no one out and a man on first, it was a classic bunt situation. But manager Tom Kelly allowed Masteller to swing away, and on McDowell's first pitch, he hit a walk-off home run into the upper deck, just inside the right-field foul pole.

Masteller was released after the season, and played for the Harrisburg Senators in the Montreal Expos organization in  before his career ended.

References

External links

1968 births
Living people
Major League Baseball first basemen
Minnesota Twins players
Elizabethton Twins players
Visalia Oaks players
Orlando Sun Rays players
Nashville Xpress players
Portland Beavers players
Salt Lake Buzz players
Massachusetts Mad Dogs players
Harrisburg Senators players
Baseball players from Ohio